Local Futures (formerly the International Society for Ecology and Culture) is a non-profit organization whose purpose is to raise awareness about what it identifies as the root causes of contemporary social, environmental, and economic crises.

The group argues that focusing on single issues – saving whales, blocking nuclear power plants, feeding the hungry, etc. – only overwhelms people and ultimately fails as a strategy. Instead, Local Futures believes that the focus must be on changing the fundamental forces that create or exacerbate all of these problems. Among those forces are economic globalization, corporate power, and conventional notions of technological and economic "progress". As a solution, Local Futures promotes economic localization and other locally based alternatives to the global consumer culture, as a means to protect both biological and cultural diversity. The group is also associated with the concept of Counter-development.

Local Futures is the parent organization of a program in Ladakh, or "Little Tibet", begun in 1975.  The Ladakh Project includes a wide range of hands-on activities, including a renewable-energy program, and has won international recognition for countering the negative effects of conventional development in that region. Local Futures' founder and Director, Helena Norberg-Hodge, shared the 1986 Right Livelihood Award.

Local Futures has produced two award-winning documentary films: Ancient Futures: Learning from Ladakh (1993) and The Economics of Happiness (2011).  An early advocate for local food (and one of the few organizations to look at local food from a global perspective), Local Futures also produced the book Bringing the Food Economy Home: Local Alternatives to Global Agribusiness (Kumarian Press, 2002), as well as Local Is Our Future (2019), and a range of other resources for local food activists. The group has also organized a series of Economics of Happiness conferences, including recent events in Berkeley, California (2012), Byron Bay, Australia (2013 & 2019), Bangalore, India (2014 & 2019), Portland, Oregon (2015), Florence, Italy (2016 & 2018), Bristol, UK (2018), Ladakh, India (2019) and Tokyo, Japan (2017, 2018 & 2019), as well as an annual event in Jeonju, South Korea.

In 2020, the organization launched an online campaign World Localization Day to strengthen and raise awareness about the emerging worldwide localization movement.

Local Futures has established a network, The International Alliance to Localization (IAL) to bring together groups and individuals from different parts of the world that are struggling to maintain their cultural integrity in the face of economic globalization. Another measure of the international reach of this small organization is that Local Futures' many publications and videos have been translated into over 40 different languages.

Local Futures' directors also form the editorial board of The Ecologist magazine.

See also
Helena Norberg-Hodge  (Local Futures' founder and director)

References

External links

 Local Futures/ISEC homepage
 The Ecologist

Foreign charities operating in India
Ecology organizations
Non-profit organizations based in Vermont